Elaine Crombie is an Aboriginal Australian actress, known for her work on stage and television. She is also a singer, songwriter, comedian, writer and producer.

Early life and education
Crombie is a Pitjantjatjara and Yankunytjatjara woman from South Australia. She and her brother were brought up by her mother's foster parents in Port Pirie, the Turners, after being given up at the age of six weeks by her mother, actor Lillian Crombie, who went to Sydney "to follow her dreams" in the performing arts. Lillian, along with her brother, had been one of the Stolen Generations.

During her teens Elaine (in her own words) "fell off the rails", and she left high school at the age of 16 to go to Adelaide University to attend the Centre for Aboriginal Studies in Music. She lived in Adelaide for two years before going to Brisbane, where she was met by her father, rugby league great Sam Backo, for the first time.

In Brisbane Crombie studied at the Aboriginal Centre for the Performing Arts for 18 months.

Career
Crombie's first break was when she auditioned successfully for Wesley Enoch's The Sunshine Club with the Queensland Theatre Company. The play toured regional Queensland, including Cairns, and did a season at the Playhouse in Brisbane in November 1999 followed by a run at the Sydney Opera House in January 2000. In 2003 she joined the tour to England to perform in the first Aboriginal written play be Kevin Wilbert The Cherry Pickers with the Sydney Theatre Company.

After spending a few years performing in Sydney and Brisbane, Crombie met and fell in love with the man who would be father to her two sons. After the birth of her second child she found herself feeling very depressed, and soon afterwards the couple split up during a family holiday, and Crombie returned to South Australia with her boys. They lived there for some years but spent periods in Sydney for performances.  they had been living in the Wollongong area for two years.

One of Crombie's earliest roles on television was in 8MMM Aboriginal Radio, a comedy series about an  Aboriginal radio station located in Alice Springs which screened on ABC Television in 2015. She played Kitty in Nakkiah Lui's 2017 comedy television series, Kiki and Kitty, made for iview  and also screened on ABC Comedy. She also appeared in many episodes of Black Comedy and played Bev in the drama series Top of the Lake.

She appeared in the feature film Top End Wedding (released in 2019).

In 2019, Crombie premiered her own show, Janet’s Vagrant Love in the Spiegeltent at Adelaide Cabaret Festival, and two years later brought a pared-back version of the show to the Adelaide Fringe. A combination of personal songs and stories, she described the show as "Love, loss, childhood trauma & raising blak men"

She co-hosted the National Indigenous Music Awards 2020 in Darwin.

Crombie stars in a touring production of Wesley Enoch's The 7 Stages of Grieving, directed by Shari Sebbens for the Sydney Theatre Company. The staging was originally scheduled for 2020, but, interrupted by the COVID-19 pandemic in Australia, was postponed until mid-2021. It is being staged in Sydney, Adelaide and Canberra, with a new epilogue that introduces a note of activism, with Crombie, Sebbens and assistant director Ian Michael calling for the audience to engage in "seven actions of healing".

Her first performance in 2022 is in the Bangarra Dance Theatre's production, Wudjang: Not the Past, which premieres at the Sydney Festival in January before touring to Hobart and Adelaide as part of the Adelaide Festival.

Awards
Crombie won the Helpmann Award for Best Female Actor in a Supporting Role in a Musical in 2019 for her role in Barbara and the Camp Dogs, in a reprise of the role at the Belvoir St Theatre that she had also undertaken in 2017.

Other roles
Crombie is a First Nations Organiser for the Media, Entertainment and Arts Alliance (MEAA).

She is a member of the South Australian Film Corporation's First Nations Advisory Committee, launched in November 2020 as part of their First Nations Screen Strategy 2020-2025, in partnership with Channel 44.

Documentary
A 2019 short documentary film in a series called Deadly Family Portraits, called Crombie Crew, focused on Elaine and her mother Lillian.  the film is available on ABC iview.

References

External links

 

Living people
21st-century Australian actresses
Indigenous Australian actresses
Year of birth missing (living people)